Acidiella may refer to:
 Acidiella (fly), a tephritid or fruit fly genus in the family Tephritidae
 Acidiella (fungus), a fungus genus in the family Teratosphaeriaceae